Little Bigfoot is a 1997 American direct-to-video family film, directed by Art Camacho. It was made by the same producers as Bigfoot: The Unforgettable Encounter and it was followed by the sequel Little Bigfoot 2: The Journey Home (1998).

Plot 
A boy, Payton Shoemaker and his little sister Maggie engage in an adventure to save (and secretly befriend) a young male bigfoot which they name him Bilbo (after Bilbo Baggins from The Hobbit) and his injured mother from a logging company who is illegally hunting them down while on summer vacation in Cedar Lake, California with their older brother, Peter, their dog, Max, and their widowed mother.

Cast 
 Ross Malinger as Payton
 P.J. Soles as Carolyn
 Kenneth Tigar as Largo
 Kelly Packard as Lanya
 Don Stroud as McKenzie

Release

Reception
American magazine TV Guide gave the film one star out of four, stating:

References

External links 
 
 

1997 films
1997 direct-to-video films
1990s American films
1990s children's adventure films
1990s English-language films
DHX Media films
American children's adventure films
American direct-to-video films
Bigfoot films
Direct-to-video adventure films
Films directed by Art Camacho
Films scored by Louis Febre